Gadpuk (also Romanized as Gadpūk; also known as Gowdeh-ye Yūk) is a village in Chamsangar Rural District, Papi District, Khorramabad County, Lorestan Province, Iran. At the 2006 census, its population was 24, in 4 families.

References 

Towns and villages in Khorramabad County